Fenimorea fabae is a species of sea snail, a marine gastropod mollusc in the family Drilliidae.

Description
The length of this marine shell varies between 7 mm and 10.5 mm.

Distribution
This marine species occurs off the Bahamas.

References

External links
  Fallon P.J. (2016). Taxonomic review of tropical western Atlantic shallow water Drilliidae (Mollusca: Gastropoda: Conoidea) including descriptions of 100 new species. Zootaxa. 4090(1): 1–363
 

fabae
Gastropods described in 2016